St. Louis Landmark is a designation of the Board of Aldermen of the City of St. Louis for historic buildings and other sites in St. Louis, Missouri. Listed sites are selected after meeting a combination of criteria, such as whether the site is a cultural resource, near a cultural resource, or contributes in aggregate to the city as a cultural resource. Once a site is designated as a landmark, it is subject to the St. Louis Preservation Board, which requires that any alterations beyond routine maintenance, up to and including demolition, must have permits that are reviewed by the Board. Many St. Louis Landmarks are also listed on the National Register of Historic Places, providing federal tax support for preservation, and some are further designated National Historic Landmarks, providing additional federal oversight.

Criteria
The Mayor appoints an eight-member Preservation Board to develop recommendations for landmark status in the city, which are then presented to and voted upon by the Board of Aldermen. Recommendations are made based on petitions submitted to the Preservation Board by property owners, city aldermen, or the St. Louis City Cultural Resources Office (on behalf of the Preservation Board itself).  The Preservation Board determines if a property is a cultural resource (and therefore is eligible for landmark status) based on whether it
Has significant character or value as part of the development, heritage or cultural characteristics of the city, state or nation; or
Is the site of a significant historic event; or
Is the work of a master whose individual work has significantly influenced the development of the city, state or nation; or
Contains elements of design, detail, materials or craftsmanship which represent a significant innovation; or
Owing to its unique location or singular physical characteristic represents an established and familiar visual feature of a neighborhood, community or the city; or
Has yielded, or is likely to yield, according to the best available scholarship, archaeological artifacts important in prehistory or history.
Is a work of art located in a public space.

However, Landmark property owned or controlled by the St. Louis Public Library, the St. Louis City Board of Education, Missouri or the United States government, or formerly owned or controlled by the former Art Museum Board of Control is exempt from the Preservation Board's authority.

National recognition
Several St. Louis Landmarks have been designated with National Historic Landmark status by the United States Secretary of the Interior for historical significance. All of those and a number of other districts, sites, buildings, structures, and objects worthy of preservation have been listed on the National Register of Historic Places. Not all St. Louis Landmarks have been listed on the National Register, and not all sites listed as National Historic Landmarks or listed on the National Register have been listed as St. Louis Landmarks. Additionally, St. Louis is home to Gateway Arch National Park (classed as a National Memorial) and Ulysses S. Grant National Historic Site (classed as a National Historic Site), neither of which are listed as St. Louis Landmarks.

List of landmarks

See also
Landmarks of St. Louis, Missouri
List of public art in St. Louis
National Register of Historic Places listings in Downtown and Downtown West St. Louis
National Register of Historic Places listings in St. Louis north and west of downtown
National Register of Historic Places listings in St. Louis south and west of downtown

References

External links
List of City Landmarks
2012 Most Endangered Landmarks

St. Louis-related lists
St. Louis
St. Louis